Forever Love (originally titled Hollywood Taiwan) is a Taiwanese film directed by Kitamura Toyoharu and Aozaru Shiao. It commemorates the golden age of Taiwanese films. It stars Lan Cheng-lung, Amber An, Tien Hsin and Wang Po-chieh. The film was released in Taiwan on 27 February 2013. Its theme song, "Da Dian Ying", was nominated for Best Original Film Song Award at the 50th Golden Horse Awards.

Plot
The 1960s was a golden age for Taiwanese films. Qi-sheng Liu (Shao-hua Long) tells his granddaughter Xiao-jie (Yi-jie Li) ”I was the most famous screenwriter at that time!” However, Xiao-jie does not believe that Taiwanese films used to be popular and doubts the story told by her grandfather. Xiao-jie's grandmother (Hai-rong Shen) has amnesia and confuses reality with dreams. She thought she was the wife of Bao-long Wan (Wang Po-Chieh), who was a Taiwanese film star at that time. Only when her grandfather tells Xiao-jie a love story that happened at that time does Xiao-jie finally understood that reason why her grandmother could not forget Bao-long Wan.

In 1969, the movie No.7 Spy (七號間諜; Qi Hao Jian Die) was released in Taiwan. Fans of Bao-long Wan lined up for the premiere hoping they could catch a glimpse of the famous star. The young Qi-sheng Liu (Blue Lan) was experiencing writer's block on his new screenplay and had just met a country girl Mei-yue Jiang (Amber An). By chance, Mei-yue came with the film crew and stood in as an extra on the set. Qi-sheng was attracted by her charm, but a movie star named Yue-feng Jin (Tien Hsin) wanted Qi-sheng for herself.

After the success of No.7 Spy, the film company decided to produce a sequel. The relationship between Qi-sheng and Mei-yue was blossoming, but the director died suddenly when they started to produce the new film. The director of the film company asked Qi-sheng to take over this work and continue to produce the film. Unfortunately, a series of problems occurred ultimately leading to cancellation of the production. The plot terminates with the revealing of whether or not the dream lover of Xiao-jie's grandmother was her grandfather or the Taiwanese star Bao-long Wan.

Cast

Main

Supporting

Cameo

Background
"Hollywood Taiwan" refers to the Beitou District located in the northernmost district of Taipei City in Taiwan. The many film studios found in Beitou led to the district's colloquial name of Hollywood Taiwan (Chinese：臺彎好萊塢；Pinyin：Taiwan Hao Lai Wu). However, because most films were made in black and white and the market was limited, the Taiwanese film industry gradually declined. Between 1955 and 1981, around a thousand Taiwanese films were produced.

Awards and nominations

References 

2013 films
Taiwanese romantic comedy films